Chris Flood (born 1 May 1947) is a former Irish Fianna Fáil politician. He was a Teachta Dála (TD) for Dublin South-West constituency. Flood was first elected to Dáil Éireann at the 1987 general election and retained his seat until retiring at the 2002 general election.

In February 1991 he was appointed as Minister of State at the Department of Health by Taoiseach Charles Haughey and retained his post when Albert Reynolds became Taoiseach. He was not re-appointed in January 1993, when Reynolds formed a government with the Labour Party.

In June 1997 he was appointed as Minister of State at the Department of Tourism, Sport and Recreation by Bertie Ahern and held that position until he resigned in January 2000.

He is the uncle of Irish international ultra runner and professional poker player Dara O'Kearney.

References

Councillors of Dublin County Council
Fianna Fáil TDs
1947 births
Living people
Members of the 25th Dáil
Members of the 26th Dáil
Members of the 27th Dáil
Members of the 28th Dáil
Ministers of State of the 28th Dáil
Ministers of State of the 26th Dáil